Akitsugu (written: 昭次) is a masculine Japanese given name. Notable people with the name include:

, Japanese swordsmith
, Japanese ski jumper

Japanese masculine given names